Kaipātiki is a local government area in New Zealand's Auckland Region, governed by the Kaipātiki Local Board and Auckland Council. It currently aligns with the council's North Shore Ward.

Geography

It includes the suburbs of Totara Vale, Wairau Valley, Bayview, Glenfield, Birkdale, Beach Haven, Hillcrest, Marlborough, Highbury, Chatswood, Northcote, Northcote Point and Birkenhead.

History

The area has several heritage sites of importance to local Māori, including a pā at Stokes Point.

Northcote and Birkenhead Points are locations of early European heritage.

Features

There are major town centres at Birkenhead, Glenfield and Northcote, as well as smaller shopping buildings. The Wairau Valley commercial industrial area is a major centre of employment.

The North Shore campus of AUT University is located on Akoranga Drive in Northcote.

Other facilities in the area include the North Shore Events Centre, the Netball North Harbour complex, and the Chelsea Estate Heritage Park and Sugar Refinery. Shoal Bay has views of the coast and the central Auckland cityscape.

References